The Eclipse Stakes is a Canadian Thoroughbred horse race run annually at Woodbine Racetrack in Toronto, Ontario. Held during the second half of May, the Grade II race is open to horses, four-years of age and older. It is contested over a distance of  miles (8.5 furlongs) on Polytrack synthetic dirt and currently offers a purse of $153.450.

Inaugurated as the Eclipse Handicap at Toronto's Greenwood Raceway in 1956, it was moved to Woodbine Racetrack in 1967. Since inception, it has been contested at various distances:
 1 mile : 1959–1960 at Greenwood Raceway
  miles : 1956, 1958 at Greenwood Raceway, since 1967 at Woodbine Racetrack
  miles : 1957, 1961–1963 at Greenwood Raceway
  miles : 1964–1966 at Greenwood Raceway
The race was not run in 2021.

Records
Speed  record: 
 1:42.40 : Ambassador B. (1977) (at current distance of  miles)
 1:42:40 : Artie's Storm (2022) 

Most wins:
 3 - Are You Kidding Me (2015, 2016, 2018)
 2 - Frost King (1982, 1983)
 2 - Royal Chocolate (1974, 1975)

Most wins by an owner:
 5 - Stafford Farms (1974, 1975, 1977, 1979, 1980)
 6 - Frank Stronach and/or Stronach Stables (1993, 1995, 2000, 2003, 2004, 2012)

Most wins by a jockey:
 7 - Robin Platts (1968, 1971, 1975, 1977, 1980, 1982, 1983)

Most wins by a trainer:
 6 - Gil Rowntree (1974, 1975, 1977, 1979, 1980, 1986)
 7 - Roger L. Attfield (1990, 1991, 1992, 2005, 2007, 2015, 2016)

Winners

*In 1965, Brother Leo finished first but was disqualified and set back to second place.

See also
 List of Canadian flat horse races

References
 The Eclipse Stakes at Pedigree Query

Graded stakes races in Canada
Recurring sporting events established in 1956
Woodbine Racetrack